Gladwin may refer to:

Places in the United States
 Gladwin, Michigan
 Gladwin Township, Michigan
 Gladwin County, Michigan
 Gladwin, West Virginia

People
Given name:
 Gladwin Hill (19141992), American journalist
 Gladwin Kotelawala, Sri Lankan Sinhala businessman and politician

Surname:
 Gladwin (surname), a surname (including a list of people with the name)

See also
 Stinking Gladwin or Gladwin iris, Iris foetidissima
 Gladwyn